Bandaru Dattatreya (born 12 June 1947) is an Indian politician serving as the current Governor of the State of Haryana since 2021. He was also the 20th Governor of Himachal Pradesh and was the Member of Lok Sabha for Secunderabad from 2014 to 2019. He belongs to the Bharatiya Janata Party (BJP).

Born in Hyderabad, Dattatreya graduated with a science degree. He joined Rashtriya Swayamsevak Sangh in 1965 and was imprisoned during The Emergency. In 1991, he was elected to the Lok Sabha from Secunderabad constituency for the first time. In 1997, he was appointed party president for the state unit. In 1998, he was re-elected and served as Union Minister of State for Urban Development in the second Vajpayee ministry. He was elected for a third consecutive time in 1999 and again served as a Minister of State in third Vajpayee ministry. He lost the Lok Sabha election in 2004 and 2009. The party appointed him as national vice-president in 2013. In May 2014, he was re-elected  to the Lok Sabha from his former constituency. In November he was made a Minister of State for Labour and Employment in the Modi ministry and became the lone minister from Telangana.

Early life
Dattatreya was born on 12 June 1947 to Bandaru Anjaiah and Eswaramma at the city of Hyderabad, in Hyderabad State. He received B.Sc. degree from Osmania University.

Political career
Dattatreya began his political career and joined Rashtriya Swayamsevak Sangh in 1965. He served as a pracharak (propagator) of the organisation from 1965 to 1968. He also served as state joint secretary of Loka Sangarsha Samiti (Jayaprakash Narayan-led Total Revolution Movement) and was imprisoned during the Emergency in the 1970s.

In 1980, Dattatreya officially joined the Bharatiya Janata Party (BJP). He was appointed general secretary of the party's Andhra Pradesh unit. He served in that position until 1989.

Dattatreya was elected to the Lok Sabha from the Secunderabad constituency In 1991. He defeated his nearest rival T. Manemma Anjaiah of the Indian National Congress by a margin of 85,063 votes. He was the only BJP candidate to win from Andhra Pradesh. In 1997, he became president of the party's Andhra Pradesh unit.

P.V. Rajeshwara Rao defeated Dattatreya in the general election held in 1996. However, two years later, he defeated Rao by a margin of 185,910 votes and was re-elected to the Lok Sabha from the Secunderabad constituency. Rediff.com wrote that the party won four constituencies in the state due to his efforts. He served as Union Minister of State (MoS) for Urban Development in the second Vajpayee ministry from 1998 to 1999.

In 1999, Dattatreya was elected to the Lok Sabha for the third time. Between 1999 and 2001, he again served as Union MoS for Urban Development in the third Vajpayee ministry. From 2001 to 2003, he served as Union MoS for Railways. In 2003, he was again given the Urban Development portfolio.

Dattatreya lost the 2004 Indian general election. In the same year, he became the national secretary of the party, a post which he held until 2006. In 2006, he was appointed president of the party's state unit. Three years later, he became a national executive member of the party. In the 2009 Indian general election, he lost his constituency for the second time. He was appointed the national vice-president of the party in 2013.

In May 2014, Dattatreya was re-elected to the Lok Sabha for the fourth time from the Secunderabad constituency. On 9 November, he was made a MoS Labour and Employment. He became the lone minister in the Modi ministry from the state of Telangana. On 1 September 2017, he resigned from his post. Subsequently, he was made a member of the standing committee on Finance.

On 21 March 2019, the BJP replaced Dattatreya with former MLA G. Kishan Reddy as its candidate from Secunderabad for the upcoming Lok Sabha elections. He was appointed the Governor of Himachal Pradesh in the year 2019.

On 18 July 2021, Dattatreya was appointed the 18th Governor of Haryana.

Personal life
Dattatreya married Vasantha on 17 May 1989. In November 2016, their daughter Vijaya Lakshmi married Jignesh Reddy, the son of chevella parliament constituency contested Janardan Reddy. On 24 May 2018, their son Vaishnav died of heart attack at the age of 21.

Dattatreya has also served as joint secretary of A. P. Cyclone Committee and general secretary for Voluntary Organisations, India.

Image
According to The Hindu, "Dattatreya is seen as the most non-controversial and acceptable BJP leader in Telangana". Business Standard wrote that he is simple, soft-spoken and has a down-to-earth nature.

Legal issues
In January 2016, Dattatreya was charged with abetting the suicide of Rohith Vemula, a student at the University of Hyderabad. Following allegations that he was instrumental in getting Vemula along with four other students suspended from the university's hostel, he was booked under the Scheduled Caste and Scheduled Tribe (Prevention of Atrocities) Act. The previous August, he wrote a letter to Smriti Irani, the minister of Human Resource Development claiming the university had turned into a "den of casteist, extremist and anti-national politics". Dattatreya denied any wrongdoing and claimed that he had received the letter from Akhil Bharatiya Vidyarthi Parishad and just forwarded it to Irani with his official letterhead. Other students of the university claimed that his letter was a "part of the larger discrimination of Dalit students".

References

External links

 Parliament of India Biography

|-

|-

|-

|-

|-

|-

India MPs 1991–1996
India MPs 1998–1999
India MPs 1999–2004
India MPs 2014–2019
1947 births
Bharatiya Janata Party politicians from Telangana
Labour ministers of India
Living people
Lok Sabha members from Andhra Pradesh
Lok Sabha members from Telangana
Narendra Modi ministry
People from Telangana
Politicians from Secunderabad
Rashtriya Swayamsevak Sangh pracharaks
Telangana politicians
Telugu politicians
Union Ministers from Telangana
Osmania University alumni
Governors of Himachal Pradesh